The following is a comprehensive discography of  Unearth, an American metalcore band. They have released seven studio albums and two EPs to date.

Studio albums

Compilations

Video albums

EPs

Music videos

Other
 2007 - Our Impact Will Be Felt
 Contribution: "Clobberin Time"/"What's Going On"
 2007 - The Best of Taste of Chaos Two.
 Contribution: "Giles"
 2007 - Aqua Teen Hunger Force Colon Movie Film for Theaters Colon the Soundtrack
 Contribution: "The Chosen"
 2006 - Revolver Presents: Future Is Metal
 2005 - Taste of Chaos
 Contribution: "This Lying World" and "Black Hearts Now Reign" (from The Oncoming Storm)
 2004 - Bring You to Your Knees: A Tribute To Guns N' Roses Compilation
 Contribution: "It's So Easy"
 2004 - MTV2 Headbangers Ball, Vol. 2
 Contribution: "The Great Dividers" (from The Oncoming Storm)
 2004 - AMP Magazine Presents: Volume 1: Hardcore
 2004 - AMP Magazine Presents: Volume 3: Metal
 2003 - MTV2 Headbangers Ball
 Contribution: "Endless" (from Endless)
 2000 - Sweet Deal!: Initial & Eulogy Sampler

References

Heavy metal group discographies
Discographies of American artists